Aoife Horgan (born 17 January 2003) is an Irish footballer who plays college soccer for the Central Connecticut Blue Devils women's soccer team and represents the Republic of Ireland women's national under-19 football team.

Club career

Early career
Horgan is from Listowel in County Kerry. She played for Listowel Celtic under-12s when she was six years old, alongside her older sister Rebecca.

Women's National League
Horgan joined Limerick WFC in 2019. On her début against Galway WFC, they lost 6–3 but Horgan got on the scoresheet. Three months later against DLR Waves, Horgan was on the scoresheet again,  not once but twice as she scored two in the last ten minutes to complete a comeback from 2–0 down to win 3–2. When Limerick were dissolved she joined new club Treaty United WFC, who were based at the same site. She made her debut for them in a 5–0 loss to Peamount United. In her next game against DLR Waves, she scored her team's second goal in a 2–0 win.

By the end of the 2020 Women's National League season, Horgan was recognised as a promising striker and one of Treaty United's best players. She was praised by club captain Marie Curtin: "She's so good. She scores goals and that is the hardest thing to do in football. She is dynamic on the turn and is such a naturally gifted footballer so it's huge for us to have someone of her capacity in the squad."

College
Horgan accepted an offer to play four years of college soccer for the Central Connecticut State University "Blue Devils". At the 2021 Northeast Conference Women's Soccer Awards she was named to the Rookie Team of the Season.

International career

Youth

Horgan represented Ireland at schoolgirl level in 2017–18 while she attended St. Joseph's Secondary School, Ballybunion. Horgan was first called up for a 2019 UEFA Women's Under-17 Championship qualification game against Albania in October 2018, but was an unused substitute in a 14–0 win. In her next call up, against the same opposition she came on in the 57th minute, and three minutes later she scored. She played well throughout the game and it finished 10–0.

With the Republic of Ireland women's national under-19 football team Horgan took part in the 2022 UEFA Women's Under-19 Championship qualification section in October 2021.

References

External links

Republic of Ireland women's association footballers
Association footballers from County Kerry
2003 births
Living people
Treaty United W.F.C. players
Women's association football forwards
Women's National League (Ireland) players
Limerick W.F.C. players
Central Connecticut Blue Devils women's soccer players
Expatriate women's soccer players in the United States
Irish expatriate sportspeople in the United States
Republic of Ireland expatriate association footballers
Republic of Ireland women's youth international footballers